The Castle Three was a British three-wheeled cyclecar made from 1919 to 1922 by the Castle Motor Company of Castle Mill Works, New Road, Kidderminster, Worcestershire.

History
The company was originally a car repair business founded in 1906 by brothers Stanley and Laughton Goodwin but grew to make munitions during World War I and entered the car building business with the coming of peace and the post-war boom.

The cars
The car was aimed at the top end of the Cyclecar market and so was fitted with a four-cylinder, water-cooled engine. The first batch of cars had side-valve, straight four, Dorman engines of 1094 cc with the remainder using Belgian Peters 1207 cc engines.  These were in-unit with a gearbox, either of two-speed epicyclic or three-speed conventional type and drove the single rear wheel by a shaft and bevel gears.

The open two-seater body with dickey seat had a smart nickel-plated radiator and electric lighting and was attached on a chassis with the suspension using quarter elliptic leaf springs at the front and semi elliptic at the rear. Unusually for a cyclecar, artillery wheels were used rather than wire-spoked ones.

The car was exhibited at the 1919 London Motor Show and a reputed 2,300 orders were taken.  Not all these were confirmed and it is estimated that around 350 were made. Two are known to survive.

A prototype of a four-wheel version was made but never went into production. The company closed in 1922, selling the works to a carpet maker.

Successor

In August 2013 the Castle Three Motor Company Limited was incorporated in Alnwick, Northumberland with  plans to develop, manufacture and sell new generation three-wheeled sports cars for the recreational and motor sport markets.

While the original had 2+1 seating and a four-cylinder engine, the new three-wheeler will have two seats and use an externally sourced twin-pot — either in V or boxer form — to power the rear wheel via a largely proprietary drivetrain.

See also
 List of car manufacturers of the United Kingdom

References 

Cyclecars
Defunct motor vehicle manufacturers of England
Kidderminster
Companies based in Worcestershire